Michaela Burešová-Loukotová (born 16 August 1967) is a Czech rower. She competed at the 1988 Summer Olympics and the 1992 Summer Olympics.

References

External links
 

1967 births
Living people
Czech female rowers
Olympic rowers of Czechoslovakia
Rowers at the 1988 Summer Olympics
Rowers at the 1992 Summer Olympics
Sportspeople from Brno